Rugby sevens was contested at the 2013 Summer Universiade from July 14 to 17 at the Dinamo Stadium and the Tulpar Stadium in Kazan, Russia. Rugby sevens makes its debut at the 2013 Summer Universiade.

Medal summary

Medal table

Medal events

Men

Sixteen teams participated in the men's tournament.

Teams

Pool A

Pool B

Pool C

Pool D

Women

Ten teams participated in the women's tournament.

Teams

Pool A

Pool B

References

External links
2013 Summer Universiade – Rugby sevens
Results book

 
2013 rugby sevens competitions
2013 Summer Universiade events
2013
Universiade